North Garland High School is a public secondary school located in Garland, Texas (USA). North Garland High School enrolls students in grades 9-12 and is a part of the Garland Independent School District. The school is known for the endorsement of its highly competitive Math, Science, and Technology Magnet Program.

History
North Garland High School opened during the 1971-1972 school year as the third high school to serve the school district.  The Class of 1973 was the first graduating class.

North Garland's school colors were chosen by selecting one color from the two high schools Garland High School and South Garland High School.  On the opening of the school on 1971,  The students had a choice between a French Raider Sam and a Western Raider Sam.  The drill team, assuming the French Raider Sam was going to receive the popular vote, selected their names to be the Mam'selles and La'Petites to match the French theme.  When the results were in, the Western Raider Sam received the popular vote, which is why the names of the drill team do not correlate with the current mascot.

In 2011, the school was rated a "Recognized Campus" by the Texas Education Agency.

In 2010, North Garland High School was named by the National Center for Educational Achievement (NCEA) as a 2010 Higher Performing School.

Academic programs
North Garland's Mathematics, Science, and Technology (MST) Magnet Program was established at 1998.  The program endorses a number of concentrations of study, including: Computer Science, Multimedia Applications, Telecommunications, Medical Academic Studies, Medical Technical Studies, Engineering, Comprehensive Science, and Interdisciplinary Studies.  Students in the MST program concentrate on a particular area of study and by archiving requirements,  the student can qualify for an endorsement on the subject of study.

Curriculum
North Garland is one of the five schools in the district that implements a block scheduling system, where students take four classes per day on alternating school days. North Garland developed the system in the spring of 1991 as part of the campus improvement plan.  It allows students to earn eight graduation credits per year compared to seven credits on the traditional system.

Statistics (per 2007)

The attendance rate for students at the school is 95%, compared with a state average of 96%. 44% of the students at North Garland are economically disadvantaged, 9% enroll in special education, 4% enroll in gifted and talent programs, 70% are enrolled in career and technology programs, and 14% are considered "limited English proficient."

The ethnic makeup of the school is 48% Hispanic, 21% African American, 13% White, non-Hispanic, 19% Asian/Pacific Islander, and less than 1% Native American.

The average class sizes at North Garland are 22 students for English, 21 for foreign language, 23 for math, 22 for science, and 24 for social studies.

Teachers at the school carry, on average, 10 years of teaching experience and 7% of the teachers on staff are first-year teachers.

Sports
North Garland High School has had a strong history of sports, and the school currently offers the following sports to students: Baseball, Basketball, Cheerleading, Cross Country, Drill Team, Football, Golf, Powerlifting, Soccer, Softball, Swimming, Tennis, Track, and Volleyball. North Garland is classified as an UIL Class 5A Classification for the 2013-2014 school year, and was put into the UIL Class 6A Region 2 District 11 for the 2014-2015 school year.

Notable alumni
Chris August - Christian music singer and record producer in Franklin, Tennessee. Graduated 2000.
Tyson Ballou - Male Supermodel, graduated in 1995.
Eric Bassey - Former Safety for the Buffalo Bills and St. Louis Rams of the NFL.  Graduated 2001.
Brett Beavers - Country music songwriter in Nashville, Tennessee.  Graduated 1981.
Michael Cain - Chairman of the Board for Dallas Film Society and graduate of the American Film Institute.
Mario K. Castillo - Lone Star College Chief Operating Officer & General Counsel. Former Interim President of Lone Star College - Kingwood. Former Labor & Employment Partner at Monty & Ramirez, LLP. Board Certified in Labor & Employment Law by the Texas Board of Legal Specialization. Author of The Employer Mandate Handbook. & Independent Contractor Misclassification Penalties Under the Affordable Care Act. Graduated 2001.
Amy Farrington - actress, Graduated 1985.
Edorian McCullough - Former sprinter and American football cornerback and running back.
Michael Phillips - Historian, author of White Metropolis: Race, Ethnicity, and Religion in Dallas, 1841-2001.
Christopher L. Smith - Graduate of Southern Methodist University Law School, admitted to the State Bar of Texas, and licensed as a radiologic technologist. Graduated 1978.
Joe Walter - is a former tackle who played thirteen seasons with the Cincinnati Bengals in the National Football League.  Graduated 1981.
Anthony Njokuani  - Professional Mixed Martial Artist. Former WEC Fighter & First Nigerian In The UFC.
Chidi Njokuani  - Professional Mixed Martial Artist. Formerly In Bellator & Currently In The UFC.

Feeder patterns
Garland ISD is a Free Choice school district, which allows the parent to choose which school his or her children want to attend within the district.

Jackson Technology Center feeds into North Garland High School for students continuing on the MST Program.  Beaver Technology Center and Watson Technology Center feed students continuing on the MST Program to Jackson Technology Center, and ultimately into North Garland High School.

See also
Garland Independent School District
Garland, Texas
Magnet School
List of high schools in Texas

References

External links

Garland Independent School District
Garland ISD Schools

High schools in Garland, Texas
Magnet schools in Texas
Garland Independent School District high schools
1971 establishments in Texas
Educational institutions established in 1971